The 2019–20 Rink Hockey European Female League was the 13th season of Europe's premier female club roller hockey competition organized by CERH. The competition was cancelled during the season due to COVID-19 pandemic.

Format
Eight teams joined the competition that changed its format and recovered the group stage. The two first qualified teams from each group qualified to the Final Four.

Teams 
Eight teams from three federations joined the competition.

Group stage
The 8 teams were allocated into two pots, according to geographical criteria.

In each group, teams played against each other home-and-away in a home-and-away round-robin format.

Only three national associations were represented in the group stage.

Group A

Group B

Final four
The final four comprises two semi-finals and a final and would take place at the ground of one of the four finalists, before it was cancelled.

Bracket

See also
2019–20 Rink Hockey Euroleague
2019–20 World Skate Europe Cup
 World Skate Europe - all competitions

References

External links
 

Rink Hockey European Female League
CERH
CERH
Rink Hockey European Female League